Westlake is an unincorporated urban community within the County of Grande Prairie No. 1 in northwest Alberta, Canada that is designated a population centre for statistical purposes in the Canadian census. The community is located within the Hamlet of Clairmont and adjacent to the City of Grande Prairie to the south. Westlake is bound by Highway 43 to the east, Highway 43X to the north, Range Road 62 to the west and 140 Avenue to the south.

Demographics 

In the 2016 Census of Population conducted by Statistics Canada, Westlake recorded a population of 1,363 living in 440 of its 470 total private dwellings, a  change from its 2011 population of 373.

References 

County of Grande Prairie No. 1
Unincorporated communities in Alberta